Overseas Elite was an American basketball team that participated in The Basketball Tournament (TBT), an annual winner-take-all single-elimination tournament. The team won the tournament four consecutive times: 2015 (prize money $1 million), 2016 ($2 million), 2017 ($2 million), and 2018 ($2 million). The roster of Overseas Elite consisted of professional basketball players who competed outside of the NBA. The team last competed in 2020.

History 
The team's name is a reference to their players being "a collection of stars who play hoops at basketball outposts around the world".

2015: First championship

Overseas Elite was accepted as a third-seed in TBT 2015 after amassing 139 registered fans. It was placed in the South region, which had Josh Selby and TeamBDB as the top seeds. Overseas Elite defeated the Underdogs, 89–83, in both teams' debuts. Errick McCollum's double-double, 18 points and 11 rebounds, helped Overseas Elite get past Team Charlotte Elite in the second round, 77–74. McCollum posted 32 points in his team's next contest, against Damien Wilkins and Trained to Go, pushing Overseas Elite to the Super 17 round of the tournament. D. J. Kennedy was instrumental in Overseas Elite's first Super 17 victory, which was vs. Sean Bell All Stars. The team became the first to qualify for the year's semifinals after it beat Dirty South, led by Brandon Robinson. It used only six players throughout the game, and it was the fifth Super 17 game to be decided by fewer than 10 points. On August 1, Overseas Elite defeated Team City of Gods to reach the championship game against Team 23. On August 2, Overseas Elite was crowned champions after winning, 67–65, with Kennedy being named MVP.

Games
Overseas Elite was the No. 3 seed in the South region.

Source:

Roster

 Travis Bader
 Kyle Fogg
 Paris Horne
 Johndre Jefferson
 Myck Kabongo
 D. J. Kennedy
 Shane Lawal
 Errick McCollum
 Todd O'Brien
 Colin Curtin (coach)

Source:

2016: Second championship

Overseas Elite defended its title in TBT 2016, beating Team Colorado, 77–72, Kyle Fogg was named MVP.

Games
Overseas Elite was the No. 2 seed in the South region.

Source:

Roster

 Travis Bader
 Kyle Fogg
 Paris Horne
 Johndre Jefferson
 Myck Kabongo
 DeAndre Kane
 D. J. Kennedy
 Errick McCollum
 Todd O'Brien
 Anthony Raffa
 Ryan Richards
 Colin Curtin (coach)

Source:

2017: Third championship

Overseas Elite won their third title in TBT 2017, defeating Team Challenge ALS, 86–83. Kyle Fogg was again named MVP.

Games
Overseas Elite was the No. 1 seed in the South region.

Roster

 Travis Bader
 DeJuan Blair
 Justin Burrell
 Kyle Fogg
 Paris Horne
 Johndre Jefferson
 DeAndre Kane
 D. J. Kennedy
 Oliver Lafayette
 Errick McCollum
 Todd O'Brien
 Colin Curtin (coach)

Source:

2018: Fourth championship

On August 3, 2018, Overseas Elite won the finals of TBT 2018, defeating Eberlein Drive, 70–58, with D. J. Kennedy being named MVP.

Games
Overseas Elite was the No. 1 seed in the South region.

Roster

 Justin Burrell
 Kyle Fogg
 Paris Horne
 Johndre Jefferson
 DeAndre Kane
 D. J. Kennedy
 Errick McCollum
 Will McDonald
 Todd O'Brien
 Jeremy Pargo
 Marc Hughes (coach)
 L. T. Lockett (asst. coach)

Source:

2019: End of reign

Errick McCollum, who had played for the team in each of the prior four tournaments, did not play in TBT 2019, due to getting married. Additionally, Kyle Fogg, who was a two-time tournament MVP, was not on the roster. Overseas Elite won their first three games, to capture their region and advance to the quarterfinals in Chicago. In the quarterfinals, they defeated Loyalty Is Love, 86–73. That win advanced Overseas Elite to the semifinals against Carmen's Crew on August 4, where they suffered their first-ever defeat, 71–66.

Games
Overseas Elite was the top seed in the Richmond Regional.

Roster

 Dominique Archie
 Bobby Brown
 Justin Burrell
 Drew Gordon
 Johndre Jefferson
 DeAndre Kane
 D. J. Kennedy
 Jeremy Pargo
 Jamarr Sanders
 Jonathon Simmons
 Tony Taylor
 Marc Hughes (coach)
 Paris Horne (asst. coach)

Source:

2020: Columbus, Ohio

For TBT 2020, Overseas Elite was named the No. 2 seed in a field of 24, reduced in size from previous tournaments due to the COVID-19 pandemic. The team won their first two games, then faced Sideline Cancer in the semifinals. Seeded 22nd, Sideline Cancer had advanced via three wins, including a defeat of third-seed Boeheim's Army. Overseas Elite led by 10 at the half and by seven after three quarters. The teams entered the Elam Ending tied at 59, thus setting a target score of 67 to win. The teams played to a 64–64 tie, with Overseas Elite taking a 65–64 lead on a free throw. The teams then traded misses, followed by Maurice Creek of Sideline Cancer making a three-point shot for a 67–65 win, denying Overseas Elite a chance at a fifth title.

Games
The team received a first-round bye.

Players

 Devin Baulkman
 Bobby Brown
 Justin Burrell
 Pooh Jeter
 Joe Johnson
 Michale Kyser
 Raphiael Putney
 Frank Session
 Xavier Silas
 Asauhn Tatum
 Dakarai Tucker
 Marc Hughes (coach)
 Paris Horne (asst. coach)

Source:

Later tournaments
On June 15, 2021, the team announced that it would not participate in TBT 2021. The team also did not return for TBT 2022.

Record by years

Awards

 In 2015, only a tournament MVP was named.

Logo and uniforms

References

Further reading

External links 
 Team page

Defunct basketball teams in the United States
The Basketball Tournament teams
Basketball teams established in 2015
Basketball teams disestablished in 2021
2015 establishments in the United States
2021 disestablishments in the United States